Mahatma College of Education, Pandikot is a B.Ed. college of Nileshwaram town in Kasaragod District, India.

History
The college was established in the year 2008.  It got affiliation with the Kannur University on the same year.

Courses offered
 B.Ed. in English, Mathematics, Physical Science, Natural Science and Social Science: 100 seats.

References

External links

Colleges affiliated to Kannur University
Colleges in Kasaragod district
Colleges of education in India